Doornfontein is an inner-city suburb of Johannesburg, South Africa, located to the east of the city centre, Region 8.

History
The area, whose name means "thorn fountain", was originally the southern part of a farm owned by Frederick Jacobus Bezuidenhout, and was proclaimed a public diggings after the discovery of gold on the Witwatersrand in 1886. The suburb was laid out in the late 1880s by Thomas Yeo, and became the first residential suburb of Johannesburg. In 1897 the freehold of the suburb was bought by a company owned by the mining magnate Barney Barnato, and the district became known as "Millionaire's Row".

Following the Anglo-Boer War, many of the wealthier residents moved north to Parktown, and Doornfontein, or "Doorie", became home to many Jewish immigrants. During the Great Depression large parts of Doornfontein were bought up by property speculators and turned into slum housing or "yards". These areas were cleared in the mid-1930s and became light industrial manufacturing areas.

Features
Large areas of Doornfontein are now occupied by the Technikon Witwatersrand, which is now a part of the University of Johannesburg, Ellis Park Stadium and Johannesburg (Athletics) Stadium. The Johannesburg meeting house of the Religious Society of Friends (Quakers) has been situated at 3 Gordon Terrace since the late 1950s. The area had undergone substantial transport renewal in 2008 in preparation for the 2010 FIFA World Cup in soccer, especially the introduction of a key route of the new rapid transit bus system.

See also
Braamfontein
New Doornfontein

References

 Musiker, N. & R., 2000. A Concise Historical Dictionary of Greater Johannesburg, Francolin Pubs., Cape Town, South Africa.

Johannesburg Region F
Jews and Judaism in Johannesburg